Summit was America's first monthly climbing and mountaineering magazine, published from 1955 to 1989.

History
Summit was founded in November, 1955 by Jene Crenshaw and Helen Kilness in Big Bear City, California. Under the leadership of Crenshaw and Kilness the magazine became very influential in US climbing circles and ran until 1989.

In 1990 a new owner David Swanson started Summit - The Mountain Journal, a quarterly publication with editor John Harlan III which ran until the summer of 1996.

See also
 Climbing magazine
 Rock & Ice

References

External links
 Alpinist #49 (2015): A House of Stone and Snow
 Summit: Archives

1955 establishments in California
1989 disestablishments in California
Monthly magazines published in the United States
Sports magazines published in the United States
Climbing magazines
Defunct magazines published in the United States
Magazines established in 1955
Magazines disestablished in 1989